The 1905 USC Methodists football team was an American football team that represented the University of Southern California during the 1905 college football season.  The team competed as an independent under head coach Harvey Holmes, compiling a 6–3–1 record. The Stanford game was USC's first outside Southern California.

Schedule

References

USC
USC Trojans football seasons
USC Methodists football
USC Methodists football